Fockenstein is a  mountain in Bavaria, Germany. It is located in what is called the Bavarian Prealps, west of the lake Tegernsee.

Geography and Climbing
The summit is on the border between the municipalities of Gaißach and Bad Wiessee. It is usually climbed from Bad Wiessee but can also be climbed from Lenggries via Geierstein. Fockenstein is also often climbed in winter, especially as part of a rather easy ski tour. While the path to the Aueralm can usually be mastered without any problems, the steep summit slopes must be assessed for avalanche danger. The Maximiliansweg from Füssen to Königssee also leads over the Fockenstein. In summer, two hours are required for the ascent from Bad Wiessee and 1.5 hours for the descent. From Lenggries (from Hohenburg Castle) over the Hirschtalsattel the ascent takes about 2.5 hours and the descent about two hours.

Photos

References

Mountains of Bavaria
Bavarian Prealps
Mountains of the Alps